En Euforisk Jul (English: A Euphoric Christmas) was the first concert residency by Swedish recording artist, Loreen. The show was performed at the Moriska Paviljongen in Malmö, Scania, Sweden, from November 26, 2014 and concluded on December 20, 2014 and was a Christmas show.

Background 

Loreen Talhaoui was currently in the U.S., but Niklas Helsingius says that the singer thought the idea behind the show was interesting and exciting and therefore accepted. There will be 16 opportunities to see Euphoric Christmas at Moriskan. The show is thus named after Loreen Eurovision Song Contest hit "Euphoria".

Set list 
The following set list is representative of the show's opening night on November 26, 2014.

"Ave Maria"
"No Woman, No Cry" 
"We Got the Power"
"Silent Night" 
"Have Yourself a Merry Little Christmas"
"Everytime"
"My Heart is Refusing Me"
"Do We Even Matter"
"Euphoria"

Shows 

Other miscellaneous performances
For companies and organisations only

References 

2014 in music
2014 concert residencies